South Galway was a UK Parliament constituency in Ireland, returning one Member of Parliament 1885–1922.

Prior to the 1885 general election the area was part of the Galway County constituency. From 1922, on the establishment of the Irish Free State, it was not represented in the UK Parliament.

Boundaries
This constituency comprised the southern part of County Galway. In 1918, the constituency was redrawn to include part of the dissolved Galway borough constituency and to exclude the district electoral divisions of Drumaan, Inishcaltra North and Mountshannon, transferred to County Clare under the Local Government (Ireland) Act 1898, which were added to the East Clare constituency.

1885–1918: The baronies of Aran, Athenry, Dunkellin, Kiltartan, Leitrim and Loughrea.

1918–1922: The rural district of Gort, that part of the rural district of Galway not included in the Galway Connemara constituency and that part of the rural district of Loughrea not included in the East Galway constituency.

Members of Parliament

Elections

Elections in the 1880s

Elections in the 1890s

Elections in the 1900s

Elections in the 1910s

References

Westminster constituencies in County Galway (historic)
Dáil constituencies in the Republic of Ireland (historic)
Constituencies of the Parliament of the United Kingdom established in 1885
Constituencies of the Parliament of the United Kingdom disestablished in 1922